Runyon is a surname based upon the French surname Rongnion, brought to North America by Vincent Rongnion. It can be also spelled Runyons, Runyan, Runyun, Runion, Rongnion, Runnion, and others. It may refer to:

People
The following people have the family name Runyon:

 Brenda Vineyard Runyon, founder of the first U.S. bank managed and directed entirely by women
 Brent Runyon, writer born in 1977 who is best known for The Burn Journals
 Damon Runyon (born Alfred Damon Runyan), hall-of-fame sports writer and short story writer
 Jennifer Runyon, American TV actress born in 1960
 Marie M. Runyon (1915-2018), New York political activist, state assembly member 1975–1976
 Marvin Travis Runyon, 20th-century American automotive executive and U.S. Postmaster 1992-1998
 Theodore Runyon, American Civil War general, diplomat, and mayor of Newark, New Jersey
 William Nelson Runyon, early 20th-century American politician from New Jersey

Places
 Damon Runyon Cancer Research Foundation of New York City
 Fort Runyon, a U.S. Civil War fort built to defend Washington, D.C.
 Runyon Canyon Park in Los Angeles
 Runyon, Florida, an unincorporated community in the United States
 Runyon, New Jersey, an unincorporated community in the United States
 Runyon Heights, Yonkers, New York
 Runyon Lake

Other
 Damon Runyon Stakes, a Thoroughbred turf race held annually in New York City
 Runyon classification, a system of classifying certain bacteria
 Runyon v. McCrary, a 1976 U.S. Supreme Court case

See also
Runyan (disambiguation)